Rafibeyli is an Azerbaijani surname. 

People bearing this surname include:

Nigar Rafibeyli -  was Azerbaijani writer and the Chairman of the Writers' Union of Azerbaijan
Khudadat Rafibeyli - Minister of Healthcare of ADR, Governor General of Ganja Governorate of Azerbaijan Democratic Republic and member of Azerbaijani National Council
Musa Rafibeyli - Minister of Social Security and Healthcare within the fourth cabinet of Azerbaijan Democratic Republic, member of Azerbaijani Parliament

Azerbaijani-language surnames